The 1982–83 season was the 37th season in FK Partizan's existence. This article shows player statistics and matches that the club played during the 1982–83 season.

Players

Squad information

Friendlies
Belgrade tournament
Winner:FK Partizan

Titograd tournament
Winner:Partizan

Skoplje tournament
2nd place:Partizan

Friendly game

Competitions

Yugoslav First League

Matches

Yugoslav Cup

See also
 List of FK Partizan seasons

References

External links
 Official website
 Partizanopedia 1982-83  (in Serbian)

FK Partizan seasons
Partizan
Yugoslav football championship-winning seasons